Echo was launched in 1791 in Liverpool as a slave ship. She made two complete voyages from Liverpool in the Atlantic triangular slave trade. On her third voyage a French privateer captured her, but a British letter of marque recaptured her. She did not return to enslaving and was last listed in 1796.

Career
Echo first appeared in Lloyd's Register (LR) in 1790.

1st enslaving voyage (1790–1791): Captain Robert Pinder sailed from Liverpool on 9 June 1790. Echo arrived at St Vincent on 15 January 1791. She arrived back at Liverpool on 7 March. She had left Liverpool with 24 crew members and she suffered one crew death on her voyage.

2nd enslaving  voyage (1791–1792): Captain Pinder sailed from Liverpool on 28 June 1791, bound for the Windward Coast. Echo started acquiring captives on 19 August, first at Bassa, and then at Grand Mesurado. She sailed from Africa on 2 March 1792, and arrived at St Vincent on 16 April with 195 captives. She sailed for Liverpool on 16 April and arrived there on 11 June. She had left Liverpool with 25 crew members and she suffered six crew deaths on her voyage.

3rd enslaving  voyage (1792–1793): Captain William Williams sailed from Liverpool on 5 August 1792, bound for West Africa. Echo gathered captives at Bassa, and then at Cape Mount.

Echo, Kelly, master, was captured off Cape Mount. 

 recaptured Echo and Little Joe. At the time of her recapture Echo had 120 captives on board.  recaptured Prosperity; the cutter  recaptured Mercury. Liberty ransomed Swift for £1000 after plundering her of 224 elephants teeth (ivory tusks), and 33 captives. Echo, Pindar, master arrived at Barbados. Echo then arrived at St Vincent in August 1793.

Fate
Echo was last listed in 1796, but with information unchanged since 1793.

Notes

Citations

References
 
 

1790 ships
Age of Sail merchant ships of England
Liverpool slave ships
Captured ships